Technical week (also called tech week, tech, techweek, production week or Hell Week) is the week prior to the opening night of a play, musical or similar production in which all of the technical elements (such as costumes, lights, sound, set and makeup) are present during rehearsal for the first time.

Prior to this point, the actors may have been rehearsing in a separate rehearsal hall, or on the stage but without all technical elements present. The director, designers, and crew may have already run through the technical elements of the show without the actors, also known as a dry tech. At this point in the rehearsal progress, it is expected that the creative aspects of the production are ready. Actors have their lines memorized; lights, sound, scenery, and costumes are fully designed and completely constructed. If the production is a musical, then the pit orchestra has rehearsed the music completely, and any dancers are prepared with their choreography memorized. During technical week all of the various technical elements are fully implemented, making the rehearsals very similar to the actual performance.  

The purpose of tech week is to rehearse the show with all technical elements in place. This allows the actors to become familiar with the set and costumes, the technical production crew to iron out unforeseen problems, and the director to see how everything comes together as an artistic whole. Tech week is when practical problems with the implementation of production elements are discovered. For example, an actor may report that their costume restricts their movement or that a hand prop is overly cumbersome. A set door that performed fine the week before may bang shut too loudly now that there are live microphones on the stage.

The first few rehearsals are characterized by the frequent stopping and starting of scenes so that the technical crew can practice their necessary duties (such as executing their cues or scene changes correctly). Everything that goes wrong during a rehearsal is expected to be fixed by the next day.  

For both the technicians and actors, it is the most hectic part of a show's run, as they are forced to do a massive amount of work getting timings and cues correct, often without having seen the scenes in their entirety.

Once the show is running smoothly, the last one or two rehearsals of technical week are often dress rehearsals which are sometimes open to the public in which the play is performed completely.

References

Stage terminology
Stagecraft
Week-long events